Melanie Scheible is an American politician and attorney serving as a member of the Nevada Senate.

Early life and education 
Scheible was born in Sacramento, California and raised in Reno, Nevada. She earned a Bachelor of Arts in public policy from Stanford University and a Juris Doctor from Columbia Law School. While in law school, Scheible interned at the Brooklyn District Attorney's Office.

Career 
Scheible remains a deputy district attorney in Clark County while out of session. Since her election in 2018, Scheible has represented the 9th district, which includes southwestern suburbs of Las Vegas in Clark County, including most of Enterprise and parts of Summerlin South and Spring Valley.

Personal life 
Scheible is bisexual. She is one of five openly-LGBT members of the Nevada Legislature, alongside senators David Parks, Pat Spearman, Dallas Harris, and Assemblywoman Sarah Peters.

References

External links
 Profile at the Nevada Senate
 Campaign website

Democratic Party Nevada state senators
Living people
21st-century American politicians
21st-century American women politicians
Women state legislators in Nevada
LGBT state legislators in Nevada
1989 births
Bisexual politicians